91-93 Fifth Avenue is an eight-story store and loft building between East 16th Street and East 17 Street in the Ladies’ Mile Historic District of Manhattan in New York City. The building was designed by Louis Korn for Henry and Samuel Corn and built between 1895 and 1896. Previous tenants include the Oxford University Press (1900, 1905) and Clarendon Press (1905).

Gallery

References

1890s architecture in the United States
Buildings and structures in Manhattan